Patrice Loko (born 6 February 1970) is French former professional footballer who played as a striker.

Career
Loko began his career at Nantes and then moved on to Paris Saint-Germain, where he was part of the team that won the 1996 Cup Winners' Cup and lost to Barcelona in the 1997 Cup Winners' Cup final. From there he went on to play for Montpellier, Lyon, Troyes, FC Lorient and Ajaccio. He also made appearances for the France national football team, including scoring at Euro 1996 against Bulgaria.

Career statistics

International

Honours
Nantes
Division 1: 1994–95

Paris Saint-Germain
UEFA Cup Winners' Cup: 1995–96
Coupe de France: 1997–98
Coupe de la Ligue: 1997–98
Trophée des Champions: 1998

Montpellier
UEFA Intertoto Cup: 1999

Lyon
Coupe de la Ligue: 2000–01

Troyes
UEFA Intertoto Cup: 2001

References

External links

 
 

1970 births
Living people
Footballers from Orléans
French footballers
France international footballers
Association football forwards
FC Nantes players
Paris Saint-Germain F.C. players
FC Lorient players
Montpellier HSC players
Olympique Lyonnais players
ES Troyes AC players
AC Ajaccio players
Ligue 1 players
Ligue 2 players
UEFA Euro 1996 players
Black French sportspeople